Clayton Nascimento Meireles (born April 12, 1989 in Cantagalo, Rio de Janeiro), better known as Clayton, is a Brazilian footballer who plays as a centre back for Barra-SC.

Career statistics

(Correct )

Honours
 Avaí
 Campeonato Catarinense: 2010

Guarani de Palhoça
Campeonato Catarinense Série B: 2012

Brusque
Campeonato Catarinense Série B: 2015

References

1989 births
Living people
Brazilian footballers
Campeonato Brasileiro Série A players
Campeonato Brasileiro Série B players
Campeonato Brasileiro Série D players
Avaí FC players
Associação Atlética Iguaçu players
Marília Atlético Clube players
Guarani de Palhoça players
Brusque Futebol Clube players
Vila Nova Futebol Clube players
Clube Náutico Marcílio Dias players
América Futebol Clube (RN) players
Association football central defenders
People from Cantagalo, Rio de Janeiro